SM U-54 was one of the 329 submarines serving in the Imperial German Navy in World War I.
U-54 was engaged in the naval warfare and took part in the First Battle of the Atlantic.

Summary of raiding history

References

Notes

Citations

Bibliography

External links
Photos of cruises of German submarine U-54 in 1916-1918. Great photo quality, comments in German.

World War I submarines of Germany
1916 ships
U-boats commissioned in 1916
Ships built in Kiel
Type U 51 submarines